John Tillman "Bud" Thomas (March 10, 1929 – August 15, 2015) was a Major League Baseball player. Thomas played for the St. Louis Browns in the 1951 season.  In 14 career games, Thomas had seven hits in 20 at-bats, with a home run.  He batted and threw right-handed and played shortstop.

External links 

 Obituary

1929 births
2015 deaths
St. Louis Browns players
Sportspeople from Sedalia, Missouri
Baseball players from Missouri
Belleville Stags players
Dayton Indians players
Elmira Pioneers players
Globe-Miami Browns players
Marshall Browns players
Memphis Chickasaws players
San Antonio Missions players
Scranton Miners players